Bal Bahadur Rai (बल बहादुर राई) (1921-2010) was the leader of the Nepali Congress political party and a former cabinet minister of Nepal government. He had shown active participation in major democratic movements in Nepal history. He started serious politics since 1947. He had served 19 times as an acting prime minister of Nepal.

Death
Rai died at the age of 90 in Kathmandu.

References

Nepali Congress politicians from Koshi Province
1921 births
2010 deaths
People from Okhaldhunga District
Rai people
Members of the National Assembly (Nepal)
Nepal MPs 1959–1960
Nepal MPs 1991–1994
Nepal MPs 1994–1999